Nagoya Lucent Tower is a 180-metre, 40-story skyscraper located Nishi-ku, Nagoya, Aichi, Japan. As of 2010, it was Japan's 49th tallest structure.

It is one of the tallest buildings in Nagoya.

External links 

 Homepage of Nagoya Lucent Tower

Skyscrapers in Nagoya
Skyscraper office buildings in Japan

Buildings and structures completed in 2007
2007 establishments in Japan